Little Noises is a 1991 drama comedy film directed by Jane Spencer. The film stars Crispin Glover as an awkward and unsuccessful writer who achieves fame after stealing the poetry of a deaf man.

Plot
Joey (Crispin Glover) is an awkward young man who is unsuccessful in his career as a writer. In order to impress his girlfriend Stella (Tatum O'Neal), Joey steals the poetry of Marty (Matthew Hutton) a deaf poet. Not only does Joey succeed, but he also manages to sign with literary agent Mathias (Rik Mayall). While Joey is successful, it comes as the cost of Marty's own happiness and the man quickly falls into a deep depression and becomes homeless. Fame quickly goes to Joey's head and as he feels little guilt over the theft or loyalty to his friends and girlfriend, he breaks off communication with all of them.

Cast
Crispin Glover as Joey
Tatum O'Neal as Stella
Nina Siemaszko as Dolores
Tate Donovan as Elliott
Matthew Hutton as Marty
Gianin Loffler as Wayne Wacker
Steven Schub as Timmy Smith
Cathy Haase as Eve
Rik Mayall as Mathias
John C. McGinley as Stu
Carole Shelley as Aunt Shirley
Carolyn Farina as Linny
Barry Papick as Bud

Release
Little Noises premiered at the 1991 Sundance Film Festival in the main competition. It also was screened in competition at Goteborg Film Festival in Sweden, and at the Wine Valley Festival in California.

Little Noises was initially intended to be released direct-to-video but was given a theatrical release by Monument Picture on June 1, 1992 in the United States.

Reception
The Los Angeles Times gave the film a mostly positive review, noting that while it had "a few flaws" the film was ultimately "a promising debut film filled with talent and feeling", calling Glover's performance 'virtuosic'. The Chicago Tribune was less positive and they commented that while they enjoyed Glover's performance, the film "drifts through a number of ill-defined, unnecessary sequences-including scenes involving Nina Siemaszko as a pretty girl with a crush on Joey, and John C. McGinley as the true poet`s drug-dealing brother-before it arrives at its surprisingly bleak conclusion."

The Chicago Sun-Times wrote a mostly negative review, stating that while the film had some highlights they also felt that the film's subplot was "pretentious" and "overreaching".

References

External links
 

1991 films
1991 comedy-drama films
1990s English-language films
American comedy-drama films
1990s American films
Films about disability